Yulin Township is a township under the administration of Wuxi County, Chongqing, China. , it has one residential community and 4 villages under its administration.

References 

Township-level divisions of Chongqing
Wuxi County